Halide minerals are those minerals with a dominant halide anion (and ). Complex halide minerals may also have polyatomic anions.

Examples include the following:
Atacamite 
Avogadrite  (K,Cs)BF
Bararite (β)
Bischofite 
Brüggenite 
Calomel 
Carnallite 
Carnallite 
Cerargyrite/Horn silver AgCl
Chlorargyrite AgCl, bromargyrite AgBr, and iodargyrite AgI
Cryolite 
Cryptohalite (a)
Dietzeite 
Eglestonite 
Embolite AgCl+AgBr
Eriochalcite 
Fluorite 
Halite NaCl
Lautarite 
Marshite CuI
Miersite AgI
Nantokite CuCl
Sal Ammoniac 
Sylvite KCl
Terlinguaite 
Tolbachite 
Villiaumite NaF
Yttrocerite (Ca,Y,Ce)F2
Yttrofluorite (Ca,Y)F2
Zavaritskite (BiO)F

Many of these minerals are water-soluble and are often found in arid areas in crusts and other deposits as are various borates, nitrates, iodates, bromates and the like.  Others, such as the fluorite group, are not water-soluble.  As a collective whole, simple halide minerals (containing fluorine through iodine, alkali metals, alkaline Earth metals, in addition to other metals/cations) occur abundantly at the surface of the Earth in a variety of geologic settings.  More complex minerals as shown below are also found.

Commercially significant halide minerals
Two commercially important halide minerals are halite and fluorite. The former is a major source of sodium chloride, in parallel with sodium chloride extracted from sea water or brine wells.  Fluorite is a major source of hydrogen fluoride, complementing the supply obtained as a byproduct of the production of fertilizer.  Carnallite and bischofite are important sources of magnesium.  Natural cryolite was historically required for the production of aluminium, however, currently most cryolite used is produced synthetically.

Many of the halide minerals occur in marine evaporite deposits. Other geologic occurrences include arid environments such as deserts. The Atacama Desert has large quantities of halide minerals as well as chlorates, iodates, oxyhalides, nitrates, borates and other water-soluble minerals. Not only do those minerals occur in subsurface geologic deposits, they also form crusts on the Earth's surface due to the low rainfall (the Atacama is the world's driest desert as well as one of the oldest at 25 million years of age).

Nickel–Strunz Classification -03- Halides 
IMA-CNMNC proposes a new hierarchical scheme (Mills et al., 2009). This list uses the Classification of Nickel–Strunz (mindat.org, 10 ed, pending publication).

Abbreviations
 REE: rare-earth element (Sc, Y, La, Ce, Pr, Nd, Pm, Sm, Eu, Gd, Tb, Dy, Ho, Er, Tm, Yb, Lu)
 PGE: platinum-group element (Ru, Rh, Pd, Os, Ir, Pt)
 * : discredited (IMA/CNMNC status)
 ? : questionable/doubtful (IMA/CNMNC status)
Regarding 03.C Aluminofluorides, 06 Borates, 08 Vanadates (04.H V[5,6] Vanadates), 09 Silicates:
 neso-: insular (from Greek  , "island")
 soro-: grouped (from Greek  , "heap, pile, mound")
 cyclo-: ringed (from Greek  , "circle")
 ino-: chained (from Greek  , "fibre", [from Ancient Greek ]) 
 phyllo-: sheeted (from Greek  , "leaf") 
 tecto-: of three-dimensional framework (from Greek  , "of building")
Nickel–Strunz code scheme NN.XY.##x
 NN: Nickel–Strunz mineral class number
 X: Nickel–Strunz mineral division letter
 Y: Nickel–Strunz mineral family letter
 ##x: Nickel–Strunz mineral/group number; x an add-on letter

Class: halides 

 03.A Simple halides, without H2O
 03.AA M:X = 1:1, 2:3, 3:5, etc.: Panichiite; 05 Nantokite, 05 Marshite, 05 Miersite; 10 Iodargyrite, 10 Tocornalite; 15 Bromargyrite, 15 Embolite*, 15 Chlorargyrite; 20 Carobbiite, 20 Griceite, 20 Halite, 20 Sylvite, 20 Villiaumite; 25 Sal ammoniac, 25 Lafossaite; 30 Calomel, 30 Kuzminite, 30 Moschelite; 35 Neighborite; 40 Chlorocalcite, 45 Kolarite, 50 Radhakrishnaite; 55 Hephaistosite, 55 Challacolloite
 03.AB M:X = 1:2: 05 Tolbachite, 10 Coccinite, 15 Sellaite; 20 Chloromagnesite*, 20 Lawrencite, 20 Scacchite; 25 Frankdicksonite, 25 Fluorite; 30 Tveitite-(Y); 35 Gagarinite-(Y); 35 Zajacite-(Ce)
 03.AC M:X = 1:3: 05 Zharchikhite, 10 Molysite; 15 Fluocerite-(Ce), 15 Fluocerite-(La), 20 Gananite
 03.B Simple Halides, with H2O
 03.BA M:X = 1:1 and 2:3: 05 Hydrohalite, 10 Carnallite
 03.BB M:X = 1:2: 05 Eriochalcite, 10 Rokuhnite, 15 Bischofite, 20 Nickelbischofite, 25 Sinjarite, 30 Antarcticite, 35 Tachyhydrite
 03.BC M:X = 1:3: 05 Chloraluminite
 03.BD Simple Halides with H2O and additional OH: 05 Cadwaladerite, 10 Lesukite, 15 Korshunovskite, 20 Nepskoeite, 25 Koenenite
 03.C Complex Halides
 03.C: Steropesite, IMA2008-032, IMA2008-039
 03.CA Borofluorides: 05 Ferruccite; 10 Avogadrite, 10 Barberiite
 03.CB Neso-aluminofluorides: 05 Cryolithionite; 15 Cryolite, 15 Elpasolite, 15 Simmonsite; 20 Colquiriite, 25 Weberite, 30 Karasugite, 35 Usovite; 40 Pachnolite, 40 Thomsenolite; 45 Carlhintzeite, 50 Yaroslavite
 03.CC Soro-aluminofluorides: 05 Gearksutite; 10 Acuminite, 10 Tikhonenkovite; 15 Artroeite; 20 Calcjarlite, 20 Jarlite, 20 Jorgensenite
 03.CD Ino-aluminofluorides: 05 Rosenbergite, 10 Prosopite
 03.CE Phyllo-aluminofluorides: 05 Chiolite
 03.CF Tekto-aluminofluorides: 05 Ralstonite, 10 Boldyrevite?, 15 Bogvadite
 03.CG Aluminofluorides with CO3, SO4, PO4: 05 Stenonite; 10 Chukhrovite-(Nd), 10 Chukhrovite-(Ce), 10 Chukhrovite-(Y), 10 Meniaylovite; 15 Creedite, 20 Boggildite, 25 Thermessaite
 03.CH: 05 Malladrite, 10 Bararite; 15 Cryptohalite, 15 Hieratite; 20 Demartinite, 25 Knasibfite
 03.CJ With MX6 complexes; M = Fe, Mn, Cu: 05 Chlormanganokalite, 05 Rinneite; 10 Erythrosiderite, 10 Kremersite; 15 Mitscherlichite, 20 Douglasite, 30 Zirklerite
 03.D Oxyhalides, Hydroxyhalides and Related Double Halides
 03.DA With Cu, etc., without Pb: 05 Melanothallite; 10a Atacamite, 10a Kempite, 10a Hibbingite, 10b Botallackite, 10b Clinoatacamite, 10b Belloite, 10c Gillardite, 10c Kapellasite, 10c Haydeeite, 10c Paratacamite, 10c Herbertsmithite; 15 Claringbullite, 20 Simonkolleite; 25 Buttgenbachite, 25 Connellite; 30 Abhurite, 35 Ponomarevite; 40 Calumetite, 40 Anthonyite; 45 Khaidarkanite, 50 Bobkingite, 55 Avdoninite, 60 Droninoite
 03.DB With Pb, Cu, etc.: 05 Diaboleite, 10 Pseudoboleite, 15 Boleite, 20 Cumengite, 25 Bideauxite, 30 Chloroxiphite, 35 Hematophanite; 40 Asisite, 40 Parkinsonite; 45 Murdochite, 50 Yedlinite
 03.DC With Pb (As, Sb, Bi), without Cu: 05 Laurionite, 05 Paralaurionite; 10 Fiedlerite, 15 Penfieldite, 20 Laurelite; 25 Zhangpeishanite, 25 Matlockite, 25 Rorisite, 25 Daubreeite, 25 Bismoclite, 25 Zavaritskite; 30 Nadorite, 30 Perite; 35 Aravaipaite, 37 Calcioaravaipaite, 40 Thorikosite, 45 Mereheadite, 50 Blixite, 55 Pinalite, 60 Symesite; 65 Ecdemite, 65 Heliophyllite; 70 Mendipite, 75 Damaraite, 80 Onoratoite, 85 Cotunnite, 90 Pseudocotunnite, 95 Barstowite
 03.DD With Hg: 05 Eglestonite, 05 Kadyrelite; 10 Poyarkovite, 15 Hanawaltite, 20 Terlinguaite, 25 Pinchite; 30 Mosesite, 30 Gianellaite; 35 Kleinite, 40 Tedhadleyite, 45 Vasilyevite, 50 Aurivilliusite, 55 Terlinguacreekite, 60 Kelyanite, 65 Comancheite
 03.DE With Rare-Earth Elements: 05 Haleniusite-(La)
 03.X Unclassified Strunz Halogenides
 03.XX Unknown: 00 Hydrophilite?, 00 Hydromolysite?, 00 Yttrocerite*, 00 Lorettoite?, 00 IMA2009-014, 00 IMA2009-015

References

External links 
Handbook of Mineralogy